Kylo may refer to:

People
Kylo-Patrick Hart, a department chair at the Texas Christian University
Kylo Jones, a player for the Western Michigan Broncos men's basketball team
Kylo Evergreen Maris, the son of Bill Maris
Kylo Turner, a former singer for the Pilgrim Travelers

Fictional characters
Prince Kylo, a character in the Doctor Who universe
Kylo Ren, the main antagonist of the sequel trilogy of the Star Wars universe

Radio
KYLO, the first callsign used by the California radio station KXSE
KYLO-LP, a Catholic radio station also in California

Technology
An alternate spelling of the Russian Kilo-class submarine
Kylo (web browser), an open source web browser

Other
Kyloe, a civil parish in the county of Northumberland, England
Kylo (given name)